Mahavir Tyagi (31 December 1899 – 22 May 1980) was a prominent Indian independence fighter and parliamentarian from Dehra Dun, Uttar Pradesh (now in Uttarakhand) India.

Early life
Tyagi was born on 31 December 1899 at Dhabarsi, Moradabad District in Uttar Pradesh, then known as the United Provinces. He was educated in Meerut, Uttar Pradesh. He joined the British Indian Army and was posted in Persia but resigned after the Jallianwala Bagh Massacre (also known as the Amritsar Massacre), which took place on 13 April 1919. He was court martialled in Quetta, capital of Baluchistan (then a part of India but now in Pakistan) and externed from Baluchistan with all pay deposits forfeited. Returning home, Tyagi became a staunch follower of Mahatma Gandhi.

In the independence movement

Mahavir Tyagi, who was active in the Kisan (peasant) movement, remained a lifelong member of the Indian National Congress. Active especially in the Western region of the United Provinces, he was imprisoned by the British eleven times. In the course of the non-co-operation movement in 1921 Mahavir Tyagi was based in Bijnor district. He was tried, inter alia, for sedition under Section 124A of the Indian Penal Code at Bulandshahr in the United Provinces, later known as Uttar Pradesh.( See Young India, 13 October 1921, and United Provinces Legislative Council Debates, 5 November 1921). In the course of the trial he was assaulted at the behest of the British Magistrate, W.E.J.Dobbs. (See Independent, 9 October 1921, Leader, 10 October 1921 and Young India, 13 October 1921) In a series of commentaries on the incident, Mahatma Gandhi condemned the assault on Tyagi. (See Young India, 13, 20, 27 October 1921 and 10 November 1921; Collected Works of Mahatma Gandhi, Volume 21, 1966 (CWMG), pp 284–5, 310–1, 312–3, 344–6, 406–7). A mass protest meeting presided over by Sayed Hassan Berni, Vakil against the Magistrate-directed assault on Tyagi was held in Bulandshahr with more than 4000 persons attending. (Young India, 13 October 1921). Describing the assault as a "crime against the nation", Gandhi asked : "Could for instance the Lord Chief Justice of England assault a prisoner being tried before him and still retain his high office?" (Young India, 20 October 1921)The editor-poet from Lahore, Zafar Ali Khan wrote a verse condemning the assault on Mahavir Tyagi. The matter of the magistrate-directed assault on Tyagi figured in the United Provinces Legislative Council on 4 November 1921. Initially evasive answers from the Government regarding action taken against the magistrate led to further questioning of Government on 5, 16 and 17 November 1921 in the course of which the Government distanced itself from the magistrate's action. The case was then transferred to the District Magistrate of Meerut and Tyagi, on being convicted and sentenced to two years' imprisonment, was sent to Agra jail.
Even after his release from prison, the seditious Tyagi would remain a marked man for the British regime which had by now identified him as a dangerous opponent. (See UP Legislative Council Debates, 19 December 1925)
In Uttar Pradesh politics Tyagi was known as a "Rafian", that is, an associate of Rafi Ahmad Kidwai, the famous Indian nationalist Muslim. (See M. Hashim Kidwai, Rafi Ahmad Kidwai, New Delhi, 1986, pp 215–216)

Mahavir Tyagi was close to, and had been a jail companion of, the leading Indian nationalist, Motilal Nehru, Jawaharlal Nehru's father. In the 1920s Tyagi helped resolve, with the help of Maulana Mohammad Ali, a misunderstanding that had arisen between Motilal Nehru and Jawaharlal Nehru (See Durga Das, India From Curzon to Nehru & After, London, 1969, pp 109–110).
From sometime in the mid-1920s Tyagi made Dehra Dun his political base.
Mahavir Tyagi was a delegate to the All Parties National Convention held at Calcutta in December 1928 – January 1929. In a statement issued along with Srinivas Iyengar, Jawaharlal Nehru and others, Tyagi supported the position that the Principles of the Constitution of India drafted by the Motilal Nehru Committee should have been based on independence rather than Dominion Status. [Selected Works of Motilal Nehru, Vol 6, New Delhi, 1995, pp. 607–609] As regards settlement of communal differences, the statement endorsed the recommendations of the Nehru Report as agreed to by the Lucknow All Parties Conference, held in August 1928. (Idem)
In November 1930, two Nepali activists, Kharag Bahadur and Dhanpati Singh, were arrested at the Delhi Railway station with documents indicating the involvement of Motilal Nehru, Jawaharlal Nehru, Vallabhbhai Patel, Mahavir Tyagi and some other Congress leaders in efforts to alienate the Gurkha soldiers from the British Indian Army.(See Kanchanmoy Mojumdar, Nepal and the Indian Nationalist Movement, pp 32–33). Tyagi was already in prison by this time, having been arrested a few months earlier for his participation in the Civil Disobedience Movement of 1930.

Political and parliamentary career
Tyagi was President of the Dehra Dun District Congress Committee in 1931 (See Selected Works of Jawaharlal Nehru, Vol 5, p. 211n) After Tyagi had served out his sentence for participation in the Civil Disobedience Movement of 1930, he was arrested again in Dehra Dun on 17 January 1932 with the resumption of Civil Disobedience and sentenced to two and a half years' imprisonment (Garhwali, Dehra Dun, 23 January 1932) In the decade before Indian independence he became a legislator in the United Provinces. In this capacity, he was, in 1939, a member of the Jaunsar-Bawar Enquiry Committee which heralded social and land reform in the tribal area of Jaunsar Bawar in Dehradun district of Uttar Pradesh (an area now forming part of Uttarakhand state). The committee recommended, inter alia, occupancy rights in land for tenants and the prohibition of forced labour. (A summary of the committee's recommendations is available in D N Majumdar, Himalayan Polyandry, Bombay, 1962, pp. 13–17.) When arrested in the Individual Satyagraha in November 1940, Tyagi was taken to Dehra Dun Jail where Jawaharlal Nehru was already lodged. (Selected Works of Jawaharlal Nehru, Vol 11, p. 506)
In 1942 Tyagi and S K D Paliwal were arrested under the Defence of India Rules on 6 June, that is more than two months before the Quit India movement was actually launched; Rafi Ahmad Kidwai had been arrested even earlier on 12 May. (Selected Works of Jawaharlal Nehru, Vol 12, p. 344) In a speech at Bombay on 18 June 1942, Nehru condemned these arrests as "putting a hindrance to civil defence work".(Idem) Three years later Nehru, on being transferred from Ahmadnagar Fort Prison to jails in the United Provinces in the summer of 1945, would see Tyagi again, then a political prisoner in Bareilly Central Jail. (Selected Works of Jawaharlal Nehru, Vol 13, p. 618)

While he himself adhered to Gandhian non-violence, Mahavir Tyagi had close contacts even among the "revolutionaries", that is those who were not opposed to using violent means to overthrow the imperial state. These included Ashfaqullah, Ram Prasad Bismil, Sachindra Nath Sanyal, Prem Kishan Khanna and Vishnu Sharan Dublish . Sachindranath Sanyal writes in his autobiography, (Bandi Jivana, p. 253), that in the 1920s, Dublish had introduced him to Mahavir Tyagi who in turn put him in touch with Ram Prasad Bismil and Ashfaqullah.(See also N C Mehrotra and Poonam Sharma, Uttar Pradesh Mein Krantikari Aandolan Ka Etihas, p. 62 and p. 67, note 8)

When riots broke out in the Indian subcontinent after its partition in 1947, Tyagi, taking inspiration from Gandhi, staked his own life to help save Muslims in his home state and to bring peace.(Choudhry Khaliquzzaman, Pathway To Pakistan, Lahore, 1961, p. 400; see also Ansar Harvani, Before Freedom and After, New Delhi, 1989, p. 100 and Qazi Jalil Abbasi's account in Bipan Chandra, The Epic Struggle, New Delhi, 1992, p. 60) For a further account of how Mahavir Tyagi took over the local administration at this time after he found that it was ineffective in controlling the situation and restoring public order, see Ajit Prasad Jain, Rafi Ahmad Kidwai : A Memoir of his Life and Times, Bombay, 1965, pp 73–74.

Tyagi's political activities extended also to the Tehri Garhwal region. He had taken a keen interest in the movement for democratic rights there and played a prominent role also in support of the movement in Tehri State for merger with independent India.( See, for example, Ajay Singh Rawat, Garhwal Himalayas : A Historical Survey, New Delhi, 1983, p. 205)

Mahavir Tyagi was a member of the Constituent Assembly of India. In this capacity he is known especially for his strong stand against unsafeguarded Preventive Detention laws and against suspension of fundamental rights in emergency situations. He stood for a fair and independent judiciary. "The seat of justice is the Seat of God", he had famously told the Constituent Assembly.(Granville Austin, The Indian Constitution : Cornerstone of A Nation, Oxford University Press, Bombay, 1966, p. 164)

On India's becoming a Republic in 1950, Tyagi remained a member of the Provisional Parliament (1950–52), and the Lower House of the Indian Parliament, that is, the First, Second and Third Lok Sabha (1952–67) from Dehradun. Tyagi was Minister for Revenue & Expenditure in the Nehru Council of Ministers (1951–53). In this capacity he introduced the First Voluntary Disclosure Scheme, known as the Tyagi Scheme, primarily, as he put it, to bring into the open incomes which had not been revealed to the alien government prior to independence. While in the Ministry of Finance, Tyagi earned a reputation as a strict economiser. His practical, man-of-the-soil approach was reflected also at the first meeting of the National Development Council, held in Delhi on 8 and 9 November 1952, where Tyagi suggested that "manual work should be made part of the daily curriculum of education".( Summary Record of Discussions of the National Development Council, NDC, Meetings : Five Decades of Nation Building, Vol 1, Government of India, Planning Commission, 2005, p. 9)

Later Mahavir Tyagi became Minister for Defence Organisation (1953–57). In this capacity, he encouraged the process of indigenisation in production as also the complete Indianisation of Indian armed forces. He inaugurated I N S Garuda, the air arm of the Indian Navy. He also initiated the project for the manufacture of HF-24, which would be the first fighter plane to be produced by a developing country. His statement in October 1955 that India would purchase defence equipment "from any country, wherever it suits her" and that India was "not tied down to any country or bloc", attracted attention around the world.("India Declares Intention to Buy Arms Anywhere", The Canberra Times, 6 October 1955). In policies and in the implementation of laws and rules, Tyagi emphasised the human element, advising officers "not to forget the human element when interpreting the rules and regulations". (Archives of speech on 10 July 1955 at Ordnance Factory, Ishapore, reproduced in Sainik Samachar, Vol 51, No. 13, 1–15 July 2004). General B M Kaul records in his memoirs that as Minister of Defence Organisation, Tyagi opposed policy proposals involving draconian measures in the tribal areas of India's North-East.( See B M Kaul, The Untold Story, New Delhi, 1967, p. 162 ) Tyagi also gave instructions for recruitment of Muslims in large numbers in the Indian Army. The proportion of Muslims in the Army had fallen after Partition of India in 1947.

Known for his independence, Tyagi opposed, even while he was a minister, the reorganisation of Indian states on a linguistic basis which was, however, ultimately carried out in 1956.(Indian Express, Madras, 24 November 1955) He welcomed the victory of the Communist Party of India in Kerala state in the General Elections of 1957 (Leader, Allahabad, 2 April 1957) Later Tyagi opposed the decision to dismiss the Communist government led by E M S Namboodiripad in Kerala at the end of the fifties, saying that this would establish a wrong precedent. A political scientist records in a significant study that Tyagi warned at the time "that the Congress Party was 'digging its own grave' by aligning with caste and communal forces". (B D. Dua, Presidential Rule in India 1950–1974 : A Study in Crisis Politics, New Delhi, 1979, p. 112) Tyagi sought also to inculcate independence in others : He was critical of the tendency among political workers obsequiously to touch their leaders' feet and lashed out also at some senior bureaucrats who, he observed, had started touching ministers' feet. (Touching of Leaders' Feet : Tyagi Deplores Tendency, The Tribune, Ambala, 26 June 1959) At the 1957 session of the All India Congress Committee (AICC), Tyagi suggested abandoning the practice of the Congress President nominating all the members of the Congress Working Committee. Though his suggestion that 10 out of the 21 Working Committee members ought to be elected was not accepted, Jawaharlal Nehru agreed with Tyagi that the same members ought not to be re-nominated year after year. (Economic Weekly, 7 September 1957)

Tyagi was Chairman of the Direct Taxes Administration Enquiry Committee (1958–59) and in that capacity paved the way, along with the Law Commission, for the Income Tax Act, 1961.

Aksai chin debate
On 5 December 1961, a year before the Sino-Indian war, Tyagi famously criticised Nehru's statement in the Indian Parliament. Nehru had commented : “But, nevertheless, the fact remains that this area is a most extraordinary area in the world so far as terrain is concerned. At that rate, no tree grows anywhere in this wide area -- there may be some shrubs.”. Tyagi retorted, pointing to his own bald head: "No hair grows on my head. Does it mean that the head has no value?". [Discussion, 5 December 1961, Lok Sabha Debates, Vol. LX, 2–8 December 1961, cited in Selected Works of Jawaharlal Nehru, (Second Series), Volume 73, p. 571]  A tense situation that had been developing in the House on the subject of the border conflict was averted as the House dissolved in laughter in which Nehru also joined. Tyagi continued to enjoy an affectionate relationship with Jawaharlal Nehru. He served as Chairman of the Public Accounts Committee of Parliament (1962–64).

Later career
In April 1964, a month before Nehru's death, Tyagi rejoined the Government as Cabinet Minister in charge of Rehabilitation. In the General Elections of 1967 which saw a popular backlash against the Congress Party, Tyagi lost to an independent candidate backed by an anti-Congress combination of parties.

In 1968 Mahavir Tyagi became the Chairman of the Fifth Finance Commission. After the split in the Congress in 1969, Tyagi stayed with the Congress(O), the organisational wing of the party. In 1970 he was elected to the Upper House of Parliament, the Rajya Sabha, from Uttar Pradesh and led the Congress(O) in the House till he retired in 1976. Tyagi's being in the Congress(O) did not prevent him from being critical of the movement led by Jayaprakash Narayan in 1974–75. He was equally critical of the Emergency imposed by Prime Minister Indira Gandhi in 1975. Mahavir Tyagi died in New Delhi on 22 May 1980. A popular figure, he had friends across political parties and was widely admired for his integrity, outspokenness, ready wit and sense of humour.

Writings
Prior to independence, Mahavir Tyagi had written a booklet on proportional representation. His memoirs in Hindustani were published in the 1960s in two volumes : (i) Ve Kranti Ke Din and (ii) Meri Kaun Sunega. These volumes have now been combined in one and, along with some other unpublished articles by Tyagi, have been published under the title Azadi Ka Andolan: Hanste Hue Ansu (Kitab Ghar, 24 Ansari Road, Daryaganj, Delhi).

See also
 The Collected Works of Mahatma Gandhi, Vol 21, Publications Division, Government of India, New Delhi, 1966
 Selected Works of Motilal Nehru, Vol 6, Ravinder Kumar and Hari Dev Sharma (eds.), Vikas Publishing House, New Delhi, 1995
 India From Curzon to Nehru And After, Durga Das, Collins, London, 1969
 Nepal and the Indian Nationalist Movement, Kanchanmoy Mojumdar, Firma K L Mukhopadhyay, Calcutta, 1975
 Selected Works of Jawaharlal Nehru, Vols 5, 11, 12, and 13, S. Gopal (Gen. Ed.), Orient Longman, New Delhi, 1973–1980
 Selected Works of Jawaharlal Nehru,(Second Series), Vol 73, Madhavan K. Palat (Ed.), Jawaharlal Nehru Memorial Fund, New Delhi, 2017
 Pathway to Pakistan, Choudhry Khaliquzzaman, Longmans, Lahore, 1961
 Before Freedom And After, Ansar Harvani, Gian Publishing House, New Delhi, 1989
 The Epic Struggle,Bipan Chandra, Orient Longman, New Delhi, 1992
 Rafi Ahmad Kidwai, Dr. M. Hashim Kidwai (Publications Division, Government of India, New Delhi), 1986
 Rafi Ahmad Kidwai : A Memoir of His Life and Times, Ajit Prasad Jain, Asia Publishing House, Bombay, 1965
 Himalayan Polyandry : Structure, Functioning and Culture Change , D. N. Majumdar, Asia Publishing House, Bombay, 1962
 Garhwal Himalayas : A Historical Survey, Ajay S. Rawat, Eastern Book Linkers, New Delhi, 1983
 The Indian Constitution : Cornerstone of A Nation, Granville Austin, Oxford University Press, Bombay, 1966 
 Summary Record of Discussions of the National Development Council Meetings, Planning Commission, Delhi, 2005
 Presidential Rule in India 1950–1974 : A Study in Crisis Politics, B.D.Dua, S.Chand & Company, New Delhi, 1979
 Distinguished Acquaintances, (Vol 2),N G Ranga, Desi Book Distributors, Vijayawada, 1976
 Uttar Pradesh Mein Krantikari Aandolan Ka Etihas, N C Mehrotra and Poonam Sharma, Atmaram & Sons, Delhi, 2017
 Bandi Jivana, Sachindra Nath Sanyal, Delhi, 1986
 The Untold Story, Gen B.M. Kaul, Allied Publishers, New Delhi, 1967
.

References

Indian independence activists from Uttar Pradesh
1899 births
1980 deaths
Members of the Constituent Assembly of India
India MPs 1952–1957
India MPs 1957–1962
India MPs 1962–1967
Rajya Sabha members from Uttar Pradesh
Lok Sabha members from Uttar Pradesh
People from Moradabad district
Politicians from Dehradun